Leo Hutchinson (9 October 1896 – 27 March 1977) was a Barbadian cricketer. He played in two first-class matches for the Barbados cricket team in 1925/26 and 1929/30.

See also
 List of Barbadian representative cricketers

References

External links
 

1896 births
1977 deaths
Barbadian cricketers
Barbados cricketers
People from Saint Joseph, Barbados